Adrienne Eliza Bailon-Houghton (née Bailon ; born October 24, 1983) is an American television personality, singer, and actress. She is a former member of the girl groups 3LW and The Cheetah Girls. From 2013 to 2022, Bailon was a co-host of the daytime talk show The Real; for which she has since won a Daytime Emmy Award.

As an actress, Bailon appeared in The Cheetah Girls films, Coach Carter and All You've Got. She has guest starred in numerous television series including That's So Raven (a role she reprises in the spin-off series Raven's Home), and The Suite Life of Zack & Cody. In 2013, Bailon became the first Latina host of a daytime talk show in the US. She also competed in The Masked Singer in 2019 as the Flamingo, finishing in third place.

Life and career

1983–2002: Early life, career beginnings, and 3LW
Bailon was born to a Puerto Rican mother, Nilda Alicea and an Ecuadorian father, Freddie Bailón, on October 24, 1983. She grew up on the Lower East Side of Manhattan. Bailon has an older sister, Claudette. She attended PS 110-The Monitor in Brooklyn and the High School for Health Professions and Human Services, but did not pursue a career in the medical field because of her musical endeavors. Bailon commented "I really wanted to be an Obstetrician! I wanted to bring babies into the world..." Bailon was discovered by Latin pop singer Ricky Martin in October 1999 while she was performing in a church choir at Madison Square Garden. Martin asked for the four best singers in the group, and Bailon was one of the four elected by Martin to perform as back-up singers as part of his Livin' la Vida Loca Tour concert show later that night.

Following the performance, Bailon became a member of the girl group 3LW. Bailon stated that she was spotted by a producer while on a field trip to Beth Israel, and was later offered a slot in the female trio. Bailon said "... coming from very humble beginnings in the projects of the Lower East Side and not having any "Hollywood" connections.... It did not seem realistic. I sang in church, acted in all the church and school plays.... So when the opportunity came to join a girl group I was ready!"

The group was signed to Epic Records. Kiely Williams and Naturi Naughton were the other two members of the group, and work on their debut album began in 1999. In 1999, the original line-up of 3LW formed. Their first single, "No More (Baby I'ma Do Right)", was released in the fall of 2000. "No More" was a chart success, and was followed by "Playas Gon' Play" in early 2001. The group's self-titled debut album, 3LW was released on November 14, 2000. The album went on to be certified platinum by the RIAA, selling 1.3 million copies in the United States.

In the summer of 2001, the group embarked on the MTV Total Request Live tour along with Destiny's Child, Dream, Nelly, Eve, and Jessica Simpson. In 2001, 3LW recorded a song with various artists including Michael Jackson, Usher, Beyoncé, Luther Vandross, Celine Dion and Mariah Carey in response to the 9/11 attacks called "What More Can I Give". In late 2001, they collaborated with Lil' Romeo and Nick Cannon for "Parents Just Don't Understand" on the Jimmy Neutron, Boy Genius soundtrack.

3LW spent the first half of 2002 in the studio, recording an album tentatively titled Same Game, Different Rules. The album and its intended lead single "Uh Oh" were presented to the label, who felt it did not have enough urban radio appeal. The tracks from Same Game, Different Rules were leaked to the Internet in MP3 format, and Epic considered dropping the girls. A fan support campaign for 3LW, named "Never Let Go of 3LW" after their song "Never Let Go" spread to the radio, and the act was retained, despite the album loss. Recording a new set of tracks, the group returned in the summer of 2002 with the P. Diddy-produced single "I Do (Wanna Get Close To You)", featuring Loon. That same summer, the group performed a concert special on Nickelodeon titled Live on Sunset. By August, the group was set to release its newest LP, A Girl Can Mack, when member Naughton left the group for good after heated arguments. A Girl Can Macks release date was pushed back a month,but sales were still disappointing debuting at No. 15 on the Billboard 200 with a disappointing 53,000 copies sold in the first week. Approaching the time that the group was ready to deliver their second album, Naturi Naughton announced that she was no longer a member of the group. Naughton alleged she had had a number of conflicts and arguments with Bailon, Williams, and their management, which led to a heated argument in August 2002 involving an altercation. Not long after, Naughton claimed she had been forced out of the group.

2003–2008: The Cheetah Girls, 3LW disbandment, and acting career
Williams and Bailon continued as a duo while using the "3LW" name, causing the press to jokingly refer to them as "2LW". According to a cover story for the October 2002 issue of Sister 2 Sister magazine, Kiely & Adrienne said they received death threats and that they had to beef up security. The departure of Naturi greatly affected the group's popularity and album sales. After the second single released from the album, "Neva Get Enuf", underperformed, auditions were held across the country for a new third member. Jessica Benson made the cut and joined 3LW in early 2003. Without Benson, the group might have had to split due to "bankruptcy". Jessica's first performance was on Live with Regis & Kelly, followed by a performance on Soul Train. In fall 2003, 3LW departed from Epic, signing with Jermaine Dupri's So So Def label. The group then began working on their fourth studio album.

While working on the album, both Bailon and Williams signed on to star in the Disney Channel film The Cheetah Girls. They starred as two of four members of a female girl group named after the film, with Raven-Symoné and Sabrina Bryan portraying the final two members. The film was released in August 2003 and was a ratings success. The Cheetah Girls soundtrack debuted at No. 33 on the Billboard 200 and was later certified 2× Platinum by the RIAA. Bailon had a supporting role on Disney Channel's That's So Raven which she played Alana. In 2005, she starred in Coach Carter as Dominique, her first theatrically released film. Walt Disney Records soon created a real-life girl group, composed of Adrienne, Kiely, and Sabrina. Raven was offered a spot in the group but declined, opting to focus on her solo career and her television series That's So Raven. The trio began working on their first studio album, later revealed to be a Christmas album. The album, titled Cheetah-licious Christmas, was released that year, and they soon left Walt Disney and signed to Hollywood Records in 2006. Bailon then starred in the MTV film All You've Got, along with R&B singer Ciara. It was released on DVD in May 2006 and premiered on MTV.

The Cheetah Girls later returned to film the sequel The Cheetah Girls 2. It premiered on August 25, 2006, and brought a total of 8.1 million viewers, becoming the highest-rated Disney Channel original movie and beating the premiere of the first of the High School Musical films. The soundtrack was released on August 15, 2006, debuted at No. 5 on the charts and was certified platinum by the end of the year. The Cheetah Girls began work on their second studio album in January 2006. "We'll be making a real album, not a soundtrack", Bailon said. The Cheetah Girls' second single from The Cheetah Girls 2 soundtrack, "Strut", considered their most successful single, was their highest-peaking single to date, peaking at No. 53 on the Billboard charts. Bailon sung lead vocals and ad-libs. Their debut album TCG was released on September 25, 2007, and featured the single "Fuego", which charted on Hot Dance Club Play's chart and had its video played in heavy rotation on Disney Channel and MTV Tr3s.

3LW's fourth studio album was originally called Phoenix Rising, but was renamed Point of No Return. The lead-off single, "Feelin' You", was added on radio stations July 12, 2006. The album was supposed to be released later that year but was pushed back to a 2007 release because of Adrienne and Kiely's involvement with Disney's Cheetah Girls franchise, and eventually fell off the release schedule. The album delays were caused by image conflicts between both groups. As a result, the album was never released. In early 2007, Bailon stated in Girls Life magazine that 3LW was on hold because of the Cheetah Girls project. However, rumors were finally put to rest by Bailon in an interview with Jonathon Jackson in 2008 when Bailon confirmed that 3LW officially disbanded after they were removed from the So So Def roster. Bailon and Williams decided to then pursue the Cheetah Girls franchise full-time.

In 2008, work on the third film in the Cheetah Girls franchise, titled The Cheetah Girls: One World was in works. According to Disney, the plot would involve the Cheetah Girls going to India to star in a Bollywood production. The film was shot in India. It premiered to over 6.2 million viewers, and reached 7 million viewers in its final half-hour. This still failed to meet the ratings of the first two and was the series' lowest-rated premiere. In the UK, its premiere night scored 412,000 on Disney Channel UK, making it No. 1 of the week, and received 182,000 on Disney Channel UK +1, also No. 1 on that channel for the week, totalling 594,000. Bailon recorded two solo songs for the film's soundtrack album, "What If" and "Stand Up".

In November 2008, Williams confirmed in an interview with In Touch Weekly that the group had officially disbanded to pursue solo careers in both acting and singing. Bailon and Bryan later confirmed the statement. As of 2012, the group is still disbanded, though all three members have stated they are "open" to working with one another again.

2009–2014: Empire Girls, I'm in Love with a Church Girl
Following the breakup of the Cheetah Girls, Bailon was signed to Island Def Jam Records and began working on her debut studio album. First confirmed in a radio interview in New York City, Bailon later confirmed the news on her official Twitter stating "For everyone who wasn't in [New York] – I officially announced I have signed a solo deal with Island Def Jam! So happy I'm finally able to tell you guys..." Bailon began working on her debut album shortly after signing with the label. Her first official musical release were the songs "Uncontrollable" and "Big Spender", both of which were featured on the Confessions of a Shopaholic film soundtrack, released in 2009. The soundtrack featured songs from numerous artists, including Lady Gaga and the Pussycat Dolls. Later that year, she was featured in the Ghostface Killah song "I'll Be That", featured on his eighth studio album Ghostdini: Wizard of Poetry in Emerald City.

Starting in 2007, Bailon began dating Rob Kardashian, the brother of Kim Kardashian. While dating Rob, Bailon appeared in a total of eight episodes of the reality series Keeping Up with the Kardashians, appearing as Rob's girlfriend. The show saw Bailon and Kardashian get tattoos with one another, among other aspects of their relationship. The couple officially split in 2009. On the breakup, Bailon stated "You know they say opposites attract. I’m a real New Yorker [...] Sometimes I think the things that matter to us were different." Though the reasoning was not announced at the time of the breakup, it was later revealed that Rob had cheated on Bailon during their relationship, which was the ultimate reason they broke up. At the end of 2008, Bailon appeared on MTV New Year's show from Times Square, in advance promotion of her upcoming afternoon hosting on the channel. In 2009, Bailon hosted the programming block New Afternoons on MTV, relocating to New York City for the job. That same year, she co-hosted MTV News Presents: Top 9 of '09, the year-end MTV New Year's programming live from inside and outside MTV Studios in Times Square. In 2012, Bailon announced that she was taking part in the reality show Empire Girls: Julissa and Adrienne, which would revolve around Bailon and friend Julissa Bermudez. Bailon said of the show's premise, "The show follows us wanting to take our careers to the next level, coming back to New York City, where we’re originally from [...] to take our careers to that next level." The show premiered on June 3, 2012 and has been a ratings success for Style Network. Bailon later appeared in the music video for Pitbull's "Give Me Everything".

On November 1, 2012, Bailon appeared as the co-host of The Pepsi Pre-show Live alongside Jesse Giddings and Jim Cantiello, a podcast that was sponsored by Pepsi, and broadcast through The X Factor (U.S. TV series) website one hour before every episode in the live rounds of the show. Also in 2012, Bailon separated from Island Def Jam due to creative differences. Bailon portrayed Katalina Santiago in the film, The Coalition, which was released on DVD and Blu-ray in February 2013. Bailon starred in the ABC Family movie, Lovestruck: The Musical, on April 21, 2013. It featured Bailon singing the Madonna classic,"Like A Virgin" with Sara Paxton and Chelsea Kane. Other songs Bailon sang in the film include a song entitled "Everlasting Love", alongside Paxton, Kane, and Drew Seeley. 
She appeared in the film I'm in Love with a Church Girl, which was released in October 2013. In 2014, Bailon became be the host of a competition show called Nail'd It! on Oxygen. The show was canceled after one season.

2014–present: The Real, The Masked Singer, and solo music
From 2013 to 2022, Bailon served as one of the co-hosts of the syndicated daytime talk show The Real originally alongside Tamar Braxton, Loni Love, Jeannie Mai, and Tamera Mowry, which premiered on July 15, 2013. Following a trial summer run during 2013 on the Fox Television Stations group, it was picked up to series the following year. Bailon became the first Latina host of a daytime talk show in the US. In 2018, Bailon and her co-hosts won the Daytime Emmy Award for Outstanding Entertainment Talk Show Host for their work.

In 2015, she made a cameo on the series Being Mary Jane. On November 17, 2017, Bailon released her debut solo album New Tradiciones, a Christmas album with both English and Spanish songs. New Tradiciones would quickly reach number 1 on the Latin charts. In November 2018, Bailon launched a jewelry line named XIXI.

After lasting twelve episodes to the season finale and placing third in the competition, Bailon was revealed to be "Flamingo" in the second season of The Masked Singer. She also owns a vegan handbag line named La Voûte.

In 2022, she returns to the role of Alana on the fifth season of the That's So Raven'''s sequel series Raven's Home, where she is now Bayside High School's principal.

Personal life
On January 26, 2015, Bailon announced on The Real the reason why she had not released her debut solo album at that point. She stated that she was "scared to fail" and that she did not like the sound of her own voice because executives at Disney praised the fact that she sounded "so young". Bailon expressed that when she got her solo record deal at Def Jam, things didn't go the way she expected.

Bailon is an Evangelical. When asked "Do you relate with I'm in Love with a Church Girl and not get involve[d] with the sins and craziness that Hollywood is all about?", she replied, "I think I've definitely tried. No one is left without a sin. Everyone  in their own different ways. Never judge one person's sins to be greater and lesser than your own. One thing I'm so grateful for was my foundation in faith. It kept me away from a lot of things like drugs that I never had an interest. I always had my faith in God. My relationship with God helped me to get along not to get caught up in those things.

 Relationships 
Bailon dated Rob Kardashian, from 2007 until 2009, after which it was revealed that they broke up because he cheated on her.

On February 5, 2015, Bailon announced via Instagram and on an episode of The Real'', that she was engaged to her boyfriend of six years, music executive at Jay-Z's Roc Nation label, Lenny Santiago. In September 2015, the couple split and they called off their engagement.

Bailon got engaged to musician Israel Houghton on August 12, 2016 in Paris after six months of dating. They were married in Paris on November 11, 2016. Bailon became the step-mother to Israel's six children from his first marriage. 

On August 5, 2022, the couple welcomed their first child and son together, Ever James, who was born via surrogate.

Discography

Studio albums

Guest appearances

Filmography

Film

Television

Music videos

Awards and nominations
Note: The year given is the year of the ceremony

References

External links

1983 births
Living people
20th-century American singers
21st-century American actresses
21st-century American singers
3LW members
Actresses from New York City
American actresses of Puerto Rican descent
American child actresses
American child singers
American Christians
American contemporary R&B singers
American women pop singers
American women singer-songwriters
American film actresses
American musicians of Puerto Rican descent
American people of Ecuadorian descent
American television actresses
American television talk show hosts
American women television personalities
Christians from New York (state)
The Cheetah Girls members
Dance-pop musicians
People from the Lower East Side
Puerto Rican television talk show hosts
Singers from New York City
Spanish-language singers of the United States
Walt Disney Records artists
Singer-songwriters from New York (state)